Pseudoligostigma enareralis is a moth in the family Crambidae described by Harrison Gray Dyar Jr. in 1914. It is found from Costa Rica to central Panama.

References

Glaphyriinae